Orléans Métropole is the métropole, an intercommunal structure, centred on the city of Orléans. It is located in the Loiret department, in the Centre-Val de Loire region, central France. It was created in April 2017, replacing the previous Communauté urbaine Orléans Métropole. Its area is 334.3 km2. Its population was 288,229 in 2019, of which 116,269 in Orléans proper.

Composition
The Orléans Métropole consists of the following 22 communes:

Boigny-sur-Bionne
Bou
Chanteau
La Chapelle-Saint-Mesmin
Chécy
Combleux
Fleury-les-Aubrais
Ingré
Mardié
Marigny-les-Usages
Olivet
Orléans
Ormes
Saint-Cyr-en-Val
Saint-Denis-en-Val
Saint-Hilaire-Saint-Mesmin
Saint-Jean-de-Braye
Saint-Jean-de-la-Ruelle
Saint-Jean-le-Blanc
Saint-Pryvé-Saint-Mesmin
Saran
Semoy

References

Orleans
Orléans
Orleans